Ryan Preston Adams (born September 30, 1993), professionally known as Rylo Rodriguez, is an American rapper signed to Lil Baby's record label 4 Pockets Full (4PF) and Virgin Music. He is known for his frequent collaborations with Lil Baby.

Early life 
Ryan Preston Adams was born in 1993 in Mobile, Alabama. He was raised in the Roger Williams Housing Projects, with his grandfather, who took care of him along with his mother, sister, and two brothers.

Career 
Adams began his career in music featuring for Lil Baby on his hit singles "Eat Or Starve" and "Stick On Me". Some of his early music involved flipping classic pop and R&B songs and recontexualizing them into stories of his life, such as "Project Baby", based on Mariah Carey's "Always Be My Baby", and "Valentines", sampling from Tamia's "Can't Get Enough". In 2018, he released Rogerville, a collaborative mixtape with fellow Mobile rapper NoCap.

In 2020, Rylo Rodriguez was signed to American rapper Lil Baby's record label 4 Pockets Full (4PF) and Virgin Music, and featured on "Forget That" in his album My Turn. He released his debut album G.I.H.F. (Goat In Human Form) on November 27, 2020, subsequently reaching number 2 on the Rolling Stone Breakthrough 25 and number 48 on the Rolling Stone Artists 500.

In 2021, Rylo Rodriguez was featured on American rapper EST Gee's song "5500 Degrees", along with Lil Baby and 42 Dugg. It peaked at number 92 on the Billboard Hot 100, becoming Rodriguez's first song to chart.

Discography

Studio albums

Singles

Other charted songs

Guest appearances

Notes

References 

1993 births
21st-century American male musicians
21st-century American rappers
African-American male rappers
21st-century African-American male singers
African-American songwriters
American hip hop musicians
American rappers
Living people
Rappers from Alabama
Southern hip hop musicians